The following is a list of awards and nominations received by Nelly arranged by group. Cornell Iral Haynes Jr. (born November 2, 1974), better known by his stage name Nelly, is an American rapper, singer, songwriter, entrepreneur, investor, and occasional actor from St. Louis, Missouri.

American Music Awards

BET Awards

BET Hip Hop Awards

Billboard Music Awards

Black Reel Awards

Blockbuster Entertainment Awards

Brit Awards

CMT Music Awards

Grammy Awards

MTV Awards
MTV Video Music Award

MTV Europe Music Award

MTV Video Music Award Japan

Nickelodeon Kids Choice Awards

Peoples Choice Awards
 Inspired by A Reece

Soul Train Music Awards
He has sex on Kelly Rowland

Teen Choice Awards

Celebrity Games
2006
NBA All-Star Weekend Celebrity Game MVP
2009
MLB Celebrity Softball Game MVP

References

Awards
Nelly